A playpen is a piece of furniture in which an infant or young toddler (typically those less than  tall and ) is placed to prevent self-harm when her/his parent or guardian is occupied or away. The earliest use of the word "playpen" cited in the Oxford English Dictionary is 1902.

History
Playpens were traditionally made of wood, and consisted of a flat rectangular platform, usually square in shape, with vertical bars on four sides, so that the child can see out. The floor of the playpen is usually a soft mat. The walls of the playpen are usually higher than the height of the child, so as to avoid climbing injuries; playpens may also have a detachable lid. There are many more modern and portable designs.

Modern playpens are portable and typically consist of a basic metal and plastic support system and mesh, soft plastic or nylon sides.  An optional removable bassinet can be attached at the top for the child to sleep in or be changed in until four months of age.  Some models have attachments such as mobiles, side pockets for supplies and toys, change table attachment, night lights, music boxes, and clip-on adapter for CD player for the child to listen to music while sleeping or playing.  Portable playpens come in different sizes, but most are expected to be collapsed into a small roll for easy storage and transport.

References

External links

Playpen safety information from the American Academy of Pediatrics

Child safety
Furniture
Pen